Carlos Gabriel Rodríguez Orantes (born 12 April 1990) is a Panamanian football who plays as a left back for Costa del Este.

Club career
He studied and graduated in Colegio Pureza de María. Carlos Rodríguez began his career with Chepo making his debut in the Liga Panameña de Fútbol during the 2007 season. In 2008 the promising fullback was sent on loan to Uruguay's Defensor Sporting and appeared in 3 league matches for the Montevideo club. Upon returning to Chepo he quickly established himself as a first team regular and had his best season in 2010/11 in which he made 29 appearances and scored 3 goals. As a result of his play with Chepo he was signed by one of Panama's top club Tauro at the conclusion of the season.

Rodríguez played for Tauro during the 2011 CONCACAF Champions League and drew the interest of fellow participant FC Dallas. On January 20, 2012 it was announced that Rodríguez had signed with FC Dallas.

Rodríguez was released by Dallas on November 19, 2012. After a season at Chepo, he returned to Tauro in January 2014, only to move abroad again in summer 2014 to play for Colombian side Fortaleza.

In July 2015 he joined San Francisco. He left the club at the end of 2017.

International career
He was part of the Panama U-20 squad that participated in the 2007 FIFA U-20 World Cup in Canada. Rodríguez made 3 appearances for Panama's Under-23 squad during qualifying for the 2008 Olympics.

In 2011, he made his debut with Panama's full national team in an August friendly match against Bolivia. He appeared in two friendlies, earning caps against Paraguay on Sept. 2 and Costa Rica on Nov. 11. He has, as of 1 August 2015, earned a total of 26 caps, scoring 1 goal and represented his country at the 2013 CONCACAF Gold Cup.

International goals
Scores and results list Panama's goal tally first.

References

External links
Profile at Tenfield Digital

1990 births
Living people
Sportspeople from Panama City
Association football defenders
Panamanian footballers
Chepo FC players
Defensor Sporting players
Tauro F.C. players
FC Dallas players
San Francisco F.C. players
Costa del Este F.C. players
Panama international footballers
2013 Copa Centroamericana players
2013 CONCACAF Gold Cup players
2014 Copa Centroamericana players
Panamanian expatriate footballers
Expatriate footballers in Uruguay
Expatriate soccer players in the United States
Expatriate footballers in Colombia
Uruguayan Primera División players
Categoría Primera A players
Major League Soccer players
Orsomarso S.C. footballers
Footballers at the 2015 Pan American Games
Pan American Games competitors for Panama